Zinc finger protein 230 is a protein that in humans is encoded by the ZNF230 gene.

References

Further reading 

Human proteins